Vlădescu is a Romanian surname. Notable people with the surname include:

G. M. Vlădescu (1885–1952), writer
Matei Vlădescu (1835–1901), general
Mihail Vlădescu (1865–1944), botanist and politician
Radu G. Vlădescu (1886–1964), academic
Sebastian Vlădescu (born 1958), economist and politician
Gheorghe Vlădescu-Răcoasa (1895–1989), sociologist and politician

Romanian-language surnames